Cripp's Cove is a cove on the coast of west Cornwall, England, UK.

The inlet is situated on the Logan Rock peninsula one mile east of Porthcurno, Cornwall. The tiny island of Seghy stands a few metres off Cripp's Cove.

References

Penwith
Coves of Cornwall